The 1812 Caracas earthquake took place in Venezuela on March 26 (on Maundy Thursday) at 4:37 p.m. It measured 7.7 on the Richter magnitude scale. It caused extensive damage in Caracas, La Guaira, Barquisimeto, San Felipe, and Mérida. An estimated 15,000–20,000 people perished as a result, in addition to incalculable material damage.

The seismic movement was so significant that in a zone named Valecillo, a new lake was formed and the river Yurubí was dammed up. Numerous rivulets changed their course in the Caracas valley, which was flooded with dirty water. 

Based on contemporary descriptions, the earthquake is believed to have consisted of two seismic shocks occurring within the span of 30 minutes. The first destroyed Caracas and the second Mérida, where it was raining when the shock occurred.

Tectonic setting
Northern Venezuela lies across the complex boundary between the Caribbean Plate and the South American Plate. The main motion between these two plates is lateral, with South America moving relatively westwards relative to the Caribbean Plate, but these is also a component of shortening with South America moving northwards relative to the Caribbean Plate. To the west of Venezuela, the Caribbean Plate is subducting beneath the South American Plate along the South Caribbean Deformed Belt. The lateral motion is accommodated by a series of dextral (right lateral) strike-slip faults, of which the Oca-Ancón fault system and the Boconó-San Sebastián-El Pilar fault system are the most important. The Boconó Fault trends SW-NE until it reaches the coast and links with the Oca-Ancón fault system, continuing coast parallel as the San Sebastián Fault. The Boconó-San Sebastián-El Pilar fault system is the most seismically active structure in Venezuela.

Earthquake
The precise details of the earthquake sequence remain uncertain. There is evidence of two separate sub-events, one to the southwest and another with an epicentre just offshore near Caracas. It is unclear which of these two events came first, or whether there was a significant time gap between them. One sub-event ruptured the northeasternmost segment of the Boconó Fault, with an estimated magnitude of 7.4  while the second sub-event ruptured the San Sebastián Fault offshore Caracas, with an estimated magnitude of 7.1 .

Response
The destruction in Caracas was so widespread that the Gazeta de Caracas suggested founding a new capital city in "the beautiful [...] Catia where pure air may be breathed".

Since the earthquake occurred on Maundy Thursday while the Venezuelan War of Independence was raging, it was explained by royalist authorities as divine punishment for the rebellion against the Spanish Crown. The archbishop of Caracas, Narciso Coll y Prat, referred to the event as "the terrifying but well-deserved earthquake" which "confirms in our days the prophecies revealed by God to men about the ancient impious and proud cities: Babylon, Jerusalem and the Tower of Babel". This prompted the widely quoted answer of Simon Bolivar: "If Nature is against us, we shall fight Nature and make it obey".

The first international assistance received by Venezuela in response to the earthquake came from the United States, "...when the congress convened in Washington decreed unanimously the sending of five ships loaded with flour, to the coasts of Venezuela to be distributed among the most indigent of its inhabitants."  This $50,000 was the first-ever instance of U.S. foreign aid.

See also
 List of earthquakes in Venezuela
 List of historical earthquakes

References

1812
1812 earthquakes
1812 in Venezuela
March 1812 events
19th century in Caracas
1812 disasters in South America
19th-century disasters in Venezuela